Salasel Castle, is a world heritage site, a part of Shushtar Historical Hydraulic System, located in the island city Shushtar, Khouzestan, Iran from the achaemenid era. Salasel Castle was registered on UNESCO's list of World Heritage Sites in 2009 and is Iran's 10th cultural heritage site to be registered on the United Nations' list together with the 12 other historical bridges, dams, canals, and buildings as Shushtar Historical Hydraulic System.

References

World Heritage Sites in Iran
Protected areas of Iran
Castles in Iran
Achaemenid castles